"Tu es toujours là" (English: "You're Always There") is a 2002 song recorded by Australian singer Tina Arena. It was the third single from the album Just Me and was released in February 2002. It was also Arena's third single in French. The song achieved moderate success in France, peaking at number 11 and being certified silver by the SNEP.

The song was also included on Arena's Greatest Hits 1994–2004 album and The Best & le meilleur. A live version is available on Vous êtes toujours là.

Track listing

CD maxi single
 "Tu es toujours là" – 4:10
 "I Hope" – 4:27
 "Soul Mate #9" – 3:25

Charts

Year-end charts

Certifications

References

2002 singles
French-language songs
Tina Arena songs
Songs written by Jacques Veneruso
2001 songs